A fraternal order is a fraternity organised as an order, with traits alluding to religious, chivalric or pseudo-chivalric orders, guilds, or secret societies. Contemporary fraternal orders typically have secular purposes, including social, cultural and mutually beneficial or charitable aims. Many friendly societies, benefit societies and mutual organisations take the form of a fraternal order.

Fraternal societies are often divided geographically into units called lodges or provinces. They sometimes involve a system of awards, medals, decorations, styles, degrees, offices, orders, or other distinctions, often associated with regalia, insignia, initiation and other rituals, secret greetings, signs, passwords, oaths, and more or less elaborate symbolism, as in chivalric orders.

Examples 
The Freemasons and Odd Fellows emerged in the 18th century in the United Kingdom and the United States. Other examples, which emerged later, include the Benevolent and Protective Order of Elks, the Independent Order of Foresters and the Loyal Order of Moose. Some may have ethnic or religious affiliations, such as Ancient Order of Hibernians or Order of Alhambra for Irish Catholics, or the Orange Order for Irish Protestants. Some orders have a clear political agenda, sometimes radical or militant - for example, the Nativist and Anti-Catholic Order of the Star Spangled Banner and Order of United Americans, active in the 1840s US, or the Ku Klux Klan. Some are associated with professions, such as the Fraternal Order of Police, while yet others are focused on academic traditions.

In the more social type, each lodge is generally responsible for its own affairs, but it is often affiliated to an order such as the Independent Order of Odd Fellows or the Independent Order of Foresters. There are typically reciprocal agreements between lodges within an order, so that if members move to other cities or countries, they can join a new lodge without an initiation period. 

The ceremonies are fairly uniform throughout an order. Occasionally, a lodge might change the order that it is affiliated to, two orders might merge, or a group of lodges will break away from an order and form a new one. For example, the Independent Order of Foresters was set up in 1874 when it separated from the Ancient Order of Foresters Foresters Friendly Society, which itself was formed from the Royal Foresters Society in 1834.

Consequently, the histories of some fraternal orders and friendly societies are difficult to follow. Often there are different, unrelated organisations with similar names.

See also 
 List of general fraternities

References